Mercatone Uno–Scanavino is a former professional cycling team which was based in San Marino and then in Italy. Throughout the 1990s it was one of the strongest Italian cycling teams in the peloton. The team was sponsored by a chain of supermarkets in Italy.

History

San Marino Team 
The team began as Mercatone Uno-Zucchini in 1992 and was based in San Marino. Riding with the team Adriano Baffi won the points classification in the 1993 Giro d'Italia. During the 1995 season the General Manager of the team was Franco Gini and the directeur sportifs were Antonio Salutini, Franco Chioccioli, Olivano Locatelli and Bruno Vicino. This team closed at the end of 1995 season with the withdrawal of the sponsor: the new team had the same sponsor but was a totally different team.

Team built around Pantani 
When Carrera Jeans manufacturers stopped sponsoring the famous Italian cycling team  at the end of 1996, it was reported that manager Davide Boifava would be building a team around Marco Pantani with Mercatone Uno as the main sponsor. However Luciano Pezzi became the President of that new team, taking with him as directeur sportifs Giuseppe Martinelli, Davide Cassani and Alessandro Giannelli and ten of the riders from Carrera including Pantani. In this way a new team based in Italy was formed with Marco Pantani as the team leader and which rode Bianchi bikes. According to former cycling champion Felice Gimondi the team was built exclusively around Pantani with directeur sportif Martinelli refusing to sign a sprinter as this could have created other objectives of the team. According to Gimondi, in this way the team was conceived similarly to the way the Bianchi cycling team was conceived in the mid-1940s as a team built around Fausto Coppi.
In the 1997 season, Pantani finished third overall at the 1997 Tour de France and won several stages including the stage to the Alpe d'Huez. The following year Pantani won the 1998 Giro d'Italia and then won the 1998 Tour de France – becoming only the seventh rider in history to achieve the Giro–Tour double. Pantani dedicated his win to the recently deceased General manager of Mercatone Uno Luciano Pezzi. After achieving this great success, the head of the branch of the Mercatone Uno supermarkets, Romano Cenni, said that the sponsor would remain in cycling as long as Pantani was still cycling. In the 1999 Giro d'Italia, Pantani dominated the race until he was suspended from the race due to a high haematocrit level. As a result, the entire Mercatone Uno team withdrew from the race. The following year the team won the 2000 Giro d'Italia with Stefano Garzelli to which he thanked Pantani for help. Although Garzelli had a contract that run until the end of the 2001 season, he left the team at the end of 2000. When Pantani abandoned the 2002 Giro d'Italia, there was immediate talk of Mercatone Uno stopping its sponsorship after the 2002 season as the team had not been invited to the 2001 and 2002 Tour de France. However the team continued during the 2003 season where Pantani rode to 14th overall in the 2003 Giro d'Italia. The team was disbanded at the end of 2003 due to the probable retirement of Pantani with several riders going to the South African team Barloworld.

Major wins 

1992
Stage 18 Vuelta a España, Enrico Zaina
1993
Settimana Ciclistica Lombarda, Enrico Zaina
Profronde van Made, Adri van der Poel
Profronde van Surhuisterveen, Adri van der Poel
Stages 2, 8 & 18 Giro d'Italia, Adriano Baffi
1994
Giro di Toscana, Francesco Casagrande
Criterium d'Abruzzo, Michele Bartoli
Firenze–Pistoia, Francesco Casagrande
Trofeo Luis Puig, Adriano Baffi
Stages 1 & 6 Paris–Nice, Mario Cipollini
Stage 1 Tirreno–Adriatico, Adriano Baffi
Brabantse Pijl, Michele Bartoli
Grand Prix Pino Cerami, Michele Bartoli
GP Industria & Artigianato di Larciano, Francesco Casagrande
Stage 13 Giro d'Italia, Michele Bartoli
Stage 15 Tour de France, Eros Poli
Stages 2 & 3 Volta Ciclista a Catalunya, Simone Biasci
Stage 6 Volta Ciclista a Catalunya, Massimo Donati
Giro della Romagna, Giuseppe Petito
Giro dell'Emilia, Francesco Casagrande
Milano–Torino, Francesco Casagrande
1995
Settimana Ciclistica Lombarda, Massimiliano Lelli
Profronde van Oostvoorne, Mario Cipollini
 National Time Trial championships, Massimiliano Lelli
Overall Driedaagse van De Panne, Michele Bartoli
Firenze–Pistoia, Francesco Casagrande
Coppa Placci, Francesco Casagrande
Trofeo Luis Puig, Mario Cipollini
Stages 4 & 5 Volta a la Comunitat Valenciana, Mario Cipollini
Stages 2 & 5 Tour de Romandie, Mario Cipollini
Giro dell'Appennino, Francesco Casagrande
Stages 1 & 3 Giro d'Italia, Mario Cipollini
Stages 2, 3 & 5 Volta Ciclista a Catalunya, Mario Cipollini
Stages 2 & 4 Tour de France, Mario Cipollini
Milano–Vignola, Angelo Canzonieri
1997
Ronde van Pijnacker, Marco Pantani
Giro del Mendrisiotto, Beat Zberg
Overall Giro di Toscana, Sergio Barbero
Coppa Placci, Beat Zberg
Stage 7 Tirreno–Adriatico
Stages 13 & 15 Tour de France, Marco Pantani
Stage 19 Tour de France, Mario Traversoni
Urkiola Igoera – Subida Urkiola, Beat Zberg
Stage 7 Tour de Pologne, Markus Zberg
1998
GP Tell, Marco Velo
De Draai van de Kaai, Marco Pantani
Profronde van Surhuisterveen, Marco Pantani
Firenze–Pistoia, Marco Velo
Gala Tour de France, Marco Pantani
Stage 4 Volta a la Comunitat Valenciana, Dimitri Konyshev
  Overall Giro d'Italia, Marco Pantani
, Mountains classification, Marco Pantani
Stages 14 & 19, Marco Pantani
Stage 16, Fabio Fontanelli
 Overall Tour de Suisse, Stefano Garzelli
Points classification, Stefano Garzelli
Combination classification, Stefano Garzelli
Stages 5 & 6, Stefano Garzelli
 National Time Trial championships, Marco Velo
 Overall Tour de France, Marco Pantani
Stages 11 & 15, Marco Pantani
Urkiola Igoera - Subida Urkiola, Simone Borgheresi
Boucles de l'Aulne, Marco Pantani
1999
Firenze–Pistoia, Marco Velo
Roma Maxima, Sergio Barbero
Overall Vuelta Ciclista a Murcia – Costa Calida, Marco Pantani
Stage 4, Marco Pantani
Stage 2 Setmana Catalana de Ciclisme, Marco Pantani
Stage 5a Setmana Catalana de Ciclisme, Fabiano Fontanelli
GP Miguel Induráin, Stefano Garzelli
Stage 3 Vuelta Ciclista al País Vasco, Stefano Garzelli
Paris–Camembert Lepetit, Fabiano Fontanelli
GP Industria & Artigianato di Larciano, Massimo Podenzana
Stages 8, 15, 19 & 20 Giro d'Italia, Marco Pantani
Giro dell'Appennino, Simone Borgheresi
 National Time Trial championships, Marco Velo
Stage 14 Tour de France, Dimitri Konyshev
Tre Valli Varesine, Sergio Barbero
GP Llodio, Marco Velo
Giro della Romagna, Roberto Conti
Grand Prix de Fourmies, Dimitri Konyshev
Coppa Sabatini, Dimitri Konyshev
Japan Cup, Sergio Barbero
2000
Acht van Chaam, Marco Pantani
Profronde van Stiphout, Marco Pantani
Overall Giro del Trentino, Simone Borgheresi
 Overall Giro d'Italia, Stefano Garzelli
Stage 18, Stefano Garzelli
Overall Tour of Sweden, Michael Andersson
Stage 2, Michael Andersson
Stage 8 Tour de Suisse, Stefano Garzelli
Mountains classification Stefano Garzelli
 National Time Trial championship, Michael Andersson
 National Time Trial championships, Marco Velo
Stages 12 & 15 Tour de France, Marco Pantani
2001
Klasika Primavera, Igor Astarloa
Stage 7 Volta Ciclista a Catalunya, Daniele De Paoli
 National Time Trial championships, Marco Velo
2002
GP Città di Rio Saliceto e Correggio, Fabiano Fontanelli
Giro della Provincia di Lucca, Fabiano Fontanelli
 National Time Trial championships, Andrey Mizurov
2003
Giro del Friuli, Joseba Albizu
Stage 2 Ster Elektrotoer, Eddy Serri
Stage 4 Ster Elektrotoer, Luca Solari
Stage 5 Ster Elektrotoer, Enrico Degano

Supplementary statistics 
Sources:

Note: The team did not exist for the 1996 Season.

Notes

Famous Mercatone Uno cyclists 
Marco Pantani
Michele Bartoli
Francesco Casagrande
Dmitri Konychev
Bruno Leali
Adriano Baffi
John Talen
Roberto Petito
Mario Cipollini
Dario Frigo
Eddy Mazzoleni
Stefano Garzelli
Daniel Clavero
Sylvester Szmyd

References 

Cycling teams based in Italy
Defunct cycling teams based in Italy
Cycling teams established in 1992
Cycling teams disestablished in 2003